The sexual abuse scandal in Burlington diocese is a significant episode in the series of Catholic sex abuse cases in the United States. The court-documented cases covered abuse in the 1970s. The courts heard these cases from 2005 through 2010. In 2010, 26 cases remaining were settled for $17.6 million.

Case of Alfred Willis
Records show that John Aloysius Marshall transferred Alfred Willis from a Montpelier parish to another in Milton after charges of sexual abuse surfaced against the priest.

$2.2 million settlement
In October 2009, the Associated Press reported that a Vermont jury awarded a former altar boy a record $2.2 million in compensatory damages in a priest sex-abuse case against the Burlington diocese.

Edward Paquette affair
Father Edward Paquette was accused in 23 lawsuits of molesting altar boys in Vermont during the 1970s. He abused several children there while Marshall was bishop.

Bishop Matano attends trial
In December 2008, bishop Salvatore Ronald Matano attended a trial in the city of Burlington in order to hear about unresolved clerical abuse affairs  of Edward Paquette that occurred within the diocese in the 1970s.

Supreme Court ruling

The Vermont Supreme Court issued a ruling called Turner v. Roman Catholic Diocese, which ruled in favor of the plaintiff Turner with Edward Paquette as the accused priest.

Bishop Angell deals with six abusive priests
During his tenure in Burlington, records show that Kenneth Anthony Angell allowed six accused priests to remain in active ministry within Vermont. He refused to identify them publicly, but then gave their names to the State Attorney General and placed them under suspension. At a news conference in March 2005, Angell described the sexual abuse scandals as the most difficult challenge he faced during his time as bishop.

Report by Richard Sipe
A May 2009 report by psychotherapist Richard Sipe, who has been a professional witness in 57 lawsuits, found that there were extensive problems in the sexual behavior of 102 Vermont clergy "whose records were available" between 1950 and 2002. Sipe claimed that 23 of these priests were sexually involved with children under the age of 13 years, of which 16 solely abuses boys, three abused both boys and girls and one abused only girls. Of those who were sexually involved with teenagers, 27 of 29 priests exploited males alone. 15 priests were reported for involvement with married women and 19 priests who had sexual relationships with adult men. He asserted that out of this group, 44 priests were heterosexual, 49 priests had a homosexual orientation, and 6 were deemed bisexual.

References

B
Roman Catholic Diocese of Burlington
Incidents of violence against boys
Incidents of violence against girls